Down Channel is a 1929 British silent adventure film directed by Michael Barringer and starring Henry Victor, Alf Goddard and Roy Travers. It was made at Cricklewood Studios.

Cast
 Henry Victor as Smiler
 Alf Goddard as Nixon
 Christopher Anthony as The Boy
 Roy Travers as Smuggler

References

Bibliography
 Low, Rachael. Filmmaking in 1930s Britain. George Allen & Unwin, 1985.
 Wood, Linda. British Films, 1927-1939. British Film Institute, 1986.

External links
 

1929 films
1929 adventure films
British adventure films
British silent films
Films set in England
Films shot at Cricklewood Studios
Seafaring films
British black-and-white films
1920s English-language films
1920s British films